TME may refer to:

 TME (operating system), Transaction Machine Environment, former ICL computer operating system
 TME (psychedelics), drugs
 Transmisogyny exempt
 Tencent Music Entertainment Group, music distribution company
 Total mesorectal excision, removal of cancerous bowel tissue
 Toyota Motor Europe
 Transmissible mink encephalopathy
 Trimethylolethane, a triol, an organic compound
 Tumor microenvironment
 Tickle Me Elmo